Thliptoceras anthropophilum is a moth in the family Crambidae. It was described by Hans Bänziger in 1987. It is found in Thailand (Chiang Mai) and Yunnan, China.

References

Moths described in 1987
Pyraustinae